Tectonatica robillardi is a species of predatory sea snail, a marine gastropod mollusk in the family Naticidae, the moon snails.

Description
 
The size af an adult shell varies between 6 mm and 20 mm.

Distribution
This marine species is found in the Indo-West Pacific along Madagascar and Réunion.

References

 Dautzenberg, Ph. (1929). Mollusques testacés marins de Madagascar. Faune des Colonies Francaises, Tome III 
  Kabat A.R. (2000) Results of the Rumphius Biohistorical Expedition to Ambon (1990). Part 10. Mollusca, Gastropoda, Naticidae. Zoologische Mededelingen 73(25): 345-380

External links
 

Naticidae
Gastropods described in 1894